Tintic School District is a school district located in western Juab County, Utah, United States.

Description
The district serves the western part of Juab County, while the Juab School District serves the very eastern portion (along the Interstate 15 corridor). The district is the second smallest of the 41 school districts within the state.

History
The Tintic School District was established in 1914 when the existing school districts in Eureka, Knightsville, Mammoth, Silver City, and the West Desert (the area near the Nevada border on the far west end of the county, including communities of Callao, Partoun, and Trout Creek) were consolidated. It originally served the children of the many mining workers of the Tintic Mining District, but as the mining industry in the area declined, so has the number of students.

Communities served
The Tintic School District serves the following communities:

 Callao
 Eureka
 Mammoth
 Partoun
 Trout Creek

Schools

The following are schools within the Tintic School District:

Elementary schools
 Eureka Elementary School - Eureka
 West Desert Elementary School - Trout Creek

High schools
 Tintic High School - Eureka
 West Desert High School - Trout Creek

See also

 List of school districts in Utah
 Juab School District

Notes

References

External links 

 
 

School districts in Utah
Education in Juab County, Utah